Visual C may refer to:
 Visual C++, an integrated development environment (IDE) product from Microsoft for the C, C++, and C++/CLI programming languages
 Visual C Sharp, Microsoft's implementation of the C# specification, included in the Microsoft Visual Studio suite of product